The 4722d Defense Group is an inactive United States Air Force unit. It was assigned to the 27th Air Division, stationed at George Air Force Base, California. It was inactivated on 31 July 1958.

This command and control organization was activated on 1 December 1956 for the ADC interceptor squadrons assigned to George AFB, California.  It was relatively short-lived, and its assigned units were reassigned to Thule AB or directly to the 27th Air Division.

Components
 327th Fighter-Interceptor Squadron, 1 December 1956 − 3 July 1958
 1st F-102 Squadron in Air Defense Command; reassigned to Thule AB, Greenland
 329th Fighter-Interceptor Squadron, 1 December 1956 − 3 July 1958
 Converted from F-86L Sabre to F-102 Delta Dagger; Reassigned directly to 27th AD.

References

  A Handbook of Aerospace Defense Organization 1946 - 1980,  by Lloyd H. Cornett and Mildred W. Johnson, Office of History, Aerospace Defense Center, Peterson Air Force Base, Colorado

External links

Aerospace Defense Command units
Air defense groups of the United States Air Force
Military units and formations in California